Southern Indiana Review is a literary magazine produced at the University of Southern Indiana since 1994. The journal is known for its Mary C. Mohr Awards in fiction, nonfiction and poetry. Work that has appeared in the journal has been honored in the Best American Short Stories and the Best American Essays.

Past contributors include Richard Newman, Liam Rector, Karen Uhlmann, Tony Hoagland, Jacob M. Appel, and Jennifer S. Davis.

Masthead
As of December 2008, the journal's editors were:
 Senior editors: Matthew Graham, Tom Wilhelmus
 Managing editor: Ron Mitchell
 Art editor: Joan Kempf deJong
 Poetry editor: Marcus Wicker
 Fiction editor: Casey Pycior
 Associate editor: Chris Dickens
 Assistant editors: Patricia Aakhus, Leisa Belleau, Randy Pease

See also
List of literary magazines

Notes

External links
 Southern Indiana Review website

1994 establishments in Indiana
Biannual magazines published in the United States
Literary magazines published in the United States
Magazines established in 1994
Magazines published in Indiana
Mass media in Evansville, Indiana
University of Southern Indiana